Teresa Weißbach (born 26 April 1981 in Zwickau, Bezirk Karl-Marx-Stadt, East Germany) is a German actress best known for her role as Miriam in the 1999 film Sonnenallee.

Biography

She grew up in Stollberg, and at 10 years old joined the Youth Theater.

At 17 she made her debut as Miriam Sommer in the film Sonnenallee. Her parents own a bakery in Stollberg, and made special pastry in celebration of the success of Sonnenallee in cinemas.

From 1999 to 2003 she studied at the University for Music and Theater in Rostock and was awarded a degree in acting. During her studies, she performed at the Volkstheater in Rostock, and at the Mecklenburg State Theatre in Schwerin, playing, among other roles, Ismene in the tragedy Antigone by Sophocles.

In 2002 she performed in the ARD television series Berlin, Berlin. In summer 2004 she trod the boards at the Bayreuth Festival, and in February 2005 she began an engagement at the Burgtheater in Vienna.

Filmography 
 Armee der Stille - La Isla Bonita, directed by Roland Lang
 Die Boxerin, directed by Catharina Deus 
 , by Jakob Schäuffelen 
 Sonst Ist Alles So Groß, Nic Niemann 
 Sommerwald, directed by Christoph Lehmann
 Barbecue Ladies, direction: Tini Tüllmann 
 Sonnenallee, directed by Leander Haußmann

External links 
  (in German)
 

1981 births
Living people
People from Zwickau
German film actresses
Rostock University of Music and Theatre alumni
German stage actresses
German television actresses
20th-century German actresses
21st-century German actresses